York and Sawyer was an American architectural firm active between 1898 and 1949. The firms' work is exemplary of Beaux-Arts architecture as it was practiced in the United States. The partners Edward York (July 23, 1863– December 30, 1928) and Philip Sawyer (1868–1949) both trained in the office of McKim, Mead & White in the 1890s. In 1898, they established their independent firm, based in New York City.

Their structure for the New-York Historical Society (1908) was extended in 1938 by Walker & Gillette. Their ability to organize, separate and coordinate mixed uses in a building is exemplified by their massive New York Athletic Club.

York and Sawyer became known as specialists in the design of banks and hospitals. Original architectural drawings by York and Sawyer are held in the Dept. of Drawings & Archives at Avery Architectural and Fine Arts Library at Columbia University in New York City.

Works

All but three projects are located in the US, two in Canada (Montreal and Toronto) and one in Argentina (Buenos Aires):
Rockefeller Hall of Vassar College (1897, later enlarged and renovated in 1916 and 1940)
Riggs National Bank, Washington, D.C. (1899)
Egbert Starr Library of Middlebury College, now known as the Axinn Center at Starr Library (1900, enlarged 1927) 
Swift Hall of Vassar College (1900, remodeled 1941)
New England Hall of Vassar College (1901, enlarged 1919, renovated 2001) 
The Chemists' Club, 52 East 41st Street, New York City (1903; adapted as the Dylan Hotel in 2000)
American Security and Trust Company Building, Washington, D.C. (1905)
New-York Historical Society (1908, enlarged by Walker & Gillette in 1938)
Metcalf House of Vassar College (1915) 
Pratt House of Vassar College (1916) 
Brooklyn Trust Company, 177 Montague Street (1913–1916)
The Martha Cook Building, University of Michigan (1915)
 Rhode Island Hospital Trust Building, Providence, Rhode Island (1917)
The Law Quadrangle at the University of Michigan. (1924-1933)
U.S. Assay Office Building, 30 Wall Street, New York City (1919)
Federal Reserve Bank of New York, 33 Liberty Street New York City (1919–1924)
Bowery Savings Bank Building, 110 East 42nd Street New York City (1921–1923)
Greenwich Savings Bank Building, 1352 Broadway (1922–24)
 Rhode Island Hospital Trust Building, Providence, Rhode Island (1917)
Pershing Square Building, 125 Park Avenue, New York City (1923)
Agricultural Insurance Company Building, Watertown, New York (1923)
860 Park Avenue, New York City (1925)
Kendrick House of Vassar College (1927) 
Old Royal Bank Building, Montreal (1926–1928 with S.G. Davenport of Montreal)
Transportation Building, 225 Broadway, New York City (1927)
Central Savings Bank Building (1928) 2100 Broadway, New York City
Blodgett Hall of Euthenics of Vassar College (1928, enlarged 1998)
Commerce Court North (1931, consulting architects with Darling and Pearson), Toronto
Brick Presbyterian Church, New York City (1938)
Herbert C. Hoover Building, Washington DC (1927-1932) 
Demarest Hall, Rutgers University, New Brunswick, New Jersey (1951)
Miss Hall's School (1924) 492 Holmes Rd, Pittsfield, MA https://www.misshalls.org/

Gallery

Associate architects and partners
 Louis Ayres (Partner)
Frederick Staples Benedict

References
Notes

Bibliography
Kathryn Horste, 1997 The Michigan Law Quadrangle: Architecture and Origins (University of Michigan)

External links 

New York Architecture Images: York and Sawyer
Emporis.com: York and Sawyer: a partial listing of New York structures
Martha Cook Alumnae Association website
Canadian (Imperial) Bank of Commerce
 York & Sawyer architectural drawings, 1921-1931, held by the Avery Architectural and Fine Arts Library, Columbia University

Companies based in Manhattan
Defunct architecture firms based in New York City